Renata Fernandes Vasconcellos (born June 10, 1972) is a Brazilian newscaster and journalist.

TV news
 Bom Dia Brasil (2003 – 2013);
 Fantástico (2013 – 2014);
 Jornal Nacional (Since 2014).

Occasional presenter
 Jornal Nacional (2005-2013 and 2014).

References 

1972 births
Living people
People from Rio de Janeiro (city)
Brazilian television news anchors
Brazilian women television presenters
Pontifical Catholic University of Rio de Janeiro alumni